Nupserha infantula is a species of beetle in the family Cerambycidae. It was described by Ganglbauer in 1889, originally under the genus Oberea.

Varietas
 Nupserha infantula var. subvelutina Gressitt, 1937
 Nupserha infantula var. flavoantennalis Breuning, 1947
 Nupserha infantula var. flavoabdominalis Breuning, 1947
 Nupserha infantula var. thienmushana Breuning, 1960
 Nupserha infantula var. szetschuana Breuning, 1947

References

infantula
Beetles described in 1889